The men's 6 miles event at the 1966 British Empire and Commonwealth Games was held on 6 August at the Independence Park in Kingston, Jamaica. It was the last time that the imperial distance was contested at the Games later being replaced by the 10,000 metres.

Results

References

Athletics at the 1966 British Empire and Commonwealth Games
1966